Sir John Burgh  was a 17th-century English soldier and military commander in the Protestant army commanded by Horace Vere in the Electorate of the Palatinate, during the Eighty Years' War and the Thirty Years' War.

Sir John was a brother of Thomas Burgh, 3rd Baron Borough of Gainsborough (1481–1549). He commanded a company in the Netherlands in 1585-6 and was appointed Governor of Doesburg after its capture.

Sir John was respected as "one of the most distinguished and scholarly soldiers of his time ... He had seen more service than any man in the army, and in all questions of military science his word was law."

References

External links
 Zedlers Universallexicon, vol.47, p. 211
 At Westminster Abbey

English military personnel of the Eighty Years' War
English army officers
Year of birth missing
Year of death missing
17th-century soldiers
English military personnel of the Thirty Years' War